Shadgan (also Romanized as Shādgān; also known as Kharafghan, Kharfaqān, and Khartaqān) is a village in Jolgeh Rural District, in the Central District of Golpayegan County, Isfahan Province, Iran. At the 2006 census, its population was 406, in 145 families.

References 

Populated places in Golpayegan County